Phumelela Luphumlo Mbande (born 8 March 1993) is a South African field hockey player for the South African national team.

International career
She participated at the 2018 Women's Hockey World Cup.

She competed at the 2020 Summer Olympics. On 23 July 2021, Mbande shared the honour of serving as a flag bearer for South Africa, alongside swimmer player Chad le Clos, at the Parade of Nations during the opening ceremony of the 2020 Summer Olympics in Tokyo, Japan.

Personal life
She as external audit manager at PricewaterhouseCoopers.

References

External links

1993 births
Living people
South African female field hockey players
Female field hockey goalkeepers
Field hockey players at the 2018 Commonwealth Games
Commonwealth Games competitors for South Africa
Field hockey players at the 2020 Summer Olympics
Olympic field hockey players of South Africa
Field hockey players at the 2010 Summer Youth Olympics
University of Pretoria alumni
20th-century South African women
21st-century South African women
Sportspeople from Pietermaritzburg
Field hockey players at the 2022 Commonwealth Games